Nestore Leoni (February 14, 1862 in L'Aquila, Abruzzo – 1947) was an Italian painter and illuminator of manuscripts (miniatore).

He was a resident of Florence. He first studied in L'Aquila, but later dedicated himself to the study of classic illumination of texts, including those in the Florentine Libraries, and set himself to imitating the antique. Among his first works was the cover of an Album, commemorating the arrival of the Emperor William II of Germany to Rome. This work was praised by the professor Niccolo Barabino of Florence. Leoni was utilized to make designs for porcelain and for documents given in memory of occasions, for example by the Società Filarmonica Fiorentina to Madame Hastreiter, after a charity concert. Cavaliere Civelli commissioned from him covers for his edition of La Vita Nuova by Dante, which he decorated on parchment, in a style from the 1500s, reproduced with chromolithography. He also completed in similar style the Canzone di Cino da Pistoia to Dante, on Death of Beatrice, offered to the queen of Italy in occasion of the centenary of Beatrice Portinari.

Other sources
.

References

19th-century Italian painters
19th-century Italian male artists
Italian male painters
20th-century Italian painters
20th-century Italian male artists
1862 births
1947 deaths
Painters from Florence
Manuscript illuminators
People from L'Aquila